
Guthram Gowt is a small settlement in the South Holland district of Lincolnshire, England. It is situated  both east from Bourne and west from Spalding, and at a bend in the River Glen.

History
The word 'gowt'  refers to a sluice or outflow, though the origin of the word is not known with complete certainty. It appears to be cognate with the French égout, sewer. Though the modern mind associates the word 'sewer' with foul water, it was not always necessarily so. There are several 'gowt' placenames on the fens, including Anton's Gowt. In a reference that predates the pumping works, the nearby turnpike toll gate was known as Guthram Cote. This is indicative, as though the spelling and form of the name vary considerably, there appears to be no reference to the use of 'gowt' in connection with Guthram's Cote before the steam engine was installed. The earlier name was still in use contemporary with the use of the engine.

In 1189, when Richard I disafforested Spalding and Pinchbeck, Guthrams Gowt was known as Gudramsende, and the precursor of the adjacent Forty Foot Drain was the Midfendic.

Pumping station
A wind-driven scoopwheel pump was operating here as early as 1766. In the 19th and early 20th century a steam-powered drainage engine was in existence, set up following the Acts of Parliament of 1841 and 1843.

The 1841 act of parliament authorized the building of an engine to drain Bourne North Fen, replacing engines (probably windmills), erected after an act of 1776, which were described as "dilapidated, decayed and entirely removed". The act of 1843 transferred all responsibility for this engine and the drainage from the Black sluice commissioners to the Bourne North Fen Commissioners, a separation of responsibilities that continued until after the Second World War. 

The book goes on to describe how proposals for a replacement engine were made in 1881, but were not taken up before Wheeler went to press.

However, in 1895 the scoopwheel was replaced: with a  centrifugal pump made by Easton & Anderson. Then in 1918 the steam engine was replaced by a  horizontal gas engine, which drove the Easton and Anderson pump via belt. In 1933 a two-cylinder Ruston diesel and a Gwynnes pump were added.

There are now no pumping facilities on site, only a rainfall telemetry station for the Environment Agency.

Geography
Guthram Gowt falls within the drainage area of the Black Sluice Internal Drainage Board. It is at the southern, upstream end of the South Forty-Foot Drain, and the location chosen for a new lock to allow traffic into the River Glen as part of the Fens Waterways Link project.

A few buildings in agricultural use are located at the site, and on the opposite side of the road is Glen farm, and on the opposite side of the River Glen, Willow Tree Farm. Guthram Gowt is served by Delaine Buses 302 service to Spalding, and the Lincolnshire CallConnect minibus service.

References

External links

 Penhey, Robert; "The Bourne Archive: Bourne Places", Boar.org.uk
 "Images in TF1722", Geograph.org.uk. Locational photos of Guthram Gowt, including the modern rainfall station

Hamlets in Lincolnshire